Norris or Noris may refer to:

Places

In Canada 
Norris, Ontario, in Algoma District

In the United Kingdom 
Hampstead Norreys (or Norris), Berkshire

In the United States 
 Norris, Illinois
 Norris, Missouri
 Norris, Nebraska
 Norris, South Carolina
 Norris, Tennessee, named after George William Norris
 Norris Dam, which forms Norris Lake, Tennessee
 Norris Geyser Basin in Yellowstone National Park
 Norristown, Pennsylvania
 Lake Norris, Florida

In Germany 
 Norisring, street circuit in Nuremberg

People 
Norris (surname), including Norris as a first name

Companies 
 Norris Locomotive Works
 Norisbank, a bank in Germany
 T. Norris & Son, London, hand-tool makers

Other 
 Noris (pencil), a popular brand of Staedtler pencil

See also 
 Norreys